The Men's individual compound W1 archery discipline at the 2016 Summer Paralympics was contested from September 10 to September 16. Ranking rounds took place on 10 September, while knockout rounds continued on September 16.

In the ranking rounds each archer shot 72 arrows, and was seeded according to score. In the knock-out stages each archer shot three arrows per set against an opponent, the scores being aggregated. Losing semifinalists compete in a bronze medal match. As the field contained 15 archers, the highest ranked archer in the ranking round, Turkey's Omer Asik, received a bye into the quarter final round.

Ranking Round
PR = Paralympic Record.

The ranking round of the men's individual compound W1 event was held on 10 September. Omer Asik of Turkey set a Paralympic ranking round record of 648 from his 72 arrows, earning a bye into the quarter final round.

Knockout stage

The knockout stages, including medal finals, were scheduled for September 16, 2016. The Knockout matches, as with the other events in the Archery competition, were single elimination barring the semi-finals (where losers play off for bronze), and as with the other individual compound events, the men's compound W1 knockout matches are contested over sets of three arrows for each archer, with the scores being aggregated.

References

Men's individual compound W1